Euphyia biangulata, the cloaked carpet, is a moth of the family Geometridae. It is found in most of Europe (including West Russia) and the Middle East.

The wingspan is 25–30 mm. The forewings show a contrast between the dark brown midfield cross-band and the paler brown basal field with the distal cream band. There are two projections of the dark brown midfield cross-band into the cream band. The dark brown midfield cross-band has a black oblong discal spot. The basal field has greenish scaling. Hindwings are plain  whitish, pale fuscous or very light grey, striated grey; with a clear dark discal mark.
The stout caterpillar is yellowish brown, or sometimes reddish brown; there is a series of blackish or dark-brown spots along the back, and a stripe of dusky freckles along each side; lower down are two slender wavy lines enclosing a dusky stripe.The head is yellowish-brown mottled with darker brown.

Adults are on wing from the end of June to August. There is one generation per year.

The larvae feed on Stellaria species, including Stellaria media. Larvae can be found from July to September. The species overwinters as a pupa.

Subspecies
Euphyia biangulata biangulata
Euphyia biangulata picata (Hübner, 1813)
Euphyia biangulata baltica (Prout, 1938)

External links

UK Moths
Fauna Europaea
Lepiforum.de

Euphyia
Moths of Europe
Taxa named by Adrian Hardy Haworth
Moths described in 1809